Robert Walter Zwanzig (born Brooklyn, New York, 9 April 1928 – died Bethesda, Maryland, May 15, 2014) was an American theoretical physicist and chemist who made important contributions to the statistical mechanics of irreversible processes, protein folding, and the theory of liquids and gases.

Background
Zwanzig received his bachelor's degree from Brooklyn Polytechnic Institute in 1948 and his master's degree from 1950 at the University of Southern California. In 1952 he completed a doctorate in physical chemistry at Caltech under the supervision of John G. Kirkwood.  His thesis title was Quantum Hydrodynamics: a statistical mechanical theory of light scattering from simple non-polar fluids. From 1951 to 1954 he worked as a post-doctoral researcher in theoretical chemistry at Yale University, and from 1954 to 1958 he was an assistant professor in chemistry at Johns Hopkins University. From 1958 to 1966 he was a physical chemist at the National Bureau of Standards and from 1966 to 1979 he was a research professor at the Institute for Physical Science and Technology of the University of Maryland, where until 1988 he held he title of Distinguished Professor. From 1974 - 75 he was a Fairchild Scholar at Caltech. From 1988 onwards he was a researcher at the National Institutes of Health (National Institute of Diabetes and Digestive and Kidney Diseases) in Bethesda, Maryland, where he was a Fogarty Scholar (1987–88) and later worked as a research scientist emeritus.

One of his early works from 1954 is often cited as the first use of free energy perturbation theory, and the resulting equation for the change in free energy is sometimes referred to as the "Zwanzig equation". In the early 1960s he wrote some now classic works on the non-equilibrium thermodynamics and statistical mechanics of irreversible processes. He developed the projection operator formalism, which made it possible to derive irreversible transport equations (such as the Boltzmann equation and other master equations) from reversible microscopic quantum mechanical dynamic equations. He drew heavily from the work of Leon van Hove. The projection operator formalism later found wide application and is now known as the Zwanzig-Mori formalism (also named after Hazime Mori, who published similar results in 1965).

An important result of the Zwanzig-Mori formalism, the Nakajima-Zwanzig equation, bears his name and reflects the important contributions of Sadao Nakajima made around the same time.

Together with Tsu-Wei Nee he derived a theory for the dielectric function and dielectric friction of dipolar liquids based on an extension of Lars Onsager's work. Later he worked on the protein folding problem among other things.

Awards and honors 
He received many awards, including

 the Peter Debye Award (1976),
 the Irving Langmuir Award (1985),
 the Joel H. Hildebrand Award (1994). 

He was a Fellow of the National Academy of Sciences and the American Chemical Society.

Selected bibliography
 Nonequilibrium Statistical Mechanics, Oxford University Press 2001

References

External links
Obituary from the University of Maryland
Biography

1928 births
2014 deaths
American physicists
American physical chemists
University of Southern California alumni
Polytechnic Institute of New York University alumni
California Institute of Technology alumni
University of Maryland, College Park faculty